Alexander Nandzik (born 12 September 1992) is a German professional footballer who plays for SGV Freiberg.

Career
In January 2020, Nandzik joined 1. FC Kaiserslautern on loan from SSV Jahn Regensburg until the end of the season.

References

External links
 

Living people
1992 births
Association football fullbacks
German footballers
2. Bundesliga players
3. Liga players
1. FC Köln II players
Fortuna Düsseldorf players
SV Wehen Wiesbaden players
SSV Jahn Regensburg players
1. FC Kaiserslautern players
SSV Jahn Regensburg II players
People from Bergisch Gladbach
Sportspeople from Cologne (region)
Footballers from North Rhine-Westphalia